The 1947–48 Fort Wayne Zollner Pistons season was the seventh season of the franchise in the National Basketball League (NBL). It would be the final season that the franchise would play in the NBL with the Zollner name included; it would later play in the Basketball Association of America, starting in the 1948–49 BAA season, with the Pistons removing the Zollner part of their name due to the league not allowing sponsors in their team names. This was the last season in Fort Wayne for  Blackie Towery and Jake Pelkington who both left the team prior to the start of the next season.

Roster

League standings

Eastern Division

Western Division

References

Fort Wayne Zollner Pistons seasons
Fort Wayne